Raimond is both a masculine given name and a surname. Notable people with the name include:

Given name
Raimond Aumann (born 1963), German footballer
Raimond Beccarie de Pavie, Seigneur de Fourquevaux (1508–1574), French soldier, politician and diplomat
Raimond Gaita (born 1946), Australian philosopher
Raimond van der Gouw (born 1963), former Dutch footballer
Raimond Kaugver (1926–1992), Estonian writer
Raimond Kolk (1924–1992), Estonian writer and critic
Raimond Lis (1888–1916), French gymnast 
Raimond Valgre (1913–1949), Estonian composer and musician

Surname
Isabelle Raimond-Pavero (born 23 February 1961) is a French politician
Jean Jacques Raimond, Jr. (1903–1961), Dutch astronomer
Jean-Bernard Raimond (1926–2016), French politician
Jean-Michel Raimond (born 1955), French physicist 
Julien Raimond (1744–1801), Haitian indigo planter

See also
Raimond-Roger
Raimund (disambiguation)
Raymond
Raymund

Masculine given names
Estonian masculine given names
French masculine given names
French-language surnames